Abbey Falls (also spelled Abbi Falls and Abbe Falls) is a waterfall in Kodagu, in the Western Ghats of Karnataka, India. It is located 8 km from the Madikeri, 122 km from Mysore, 144 km from Mangalore and 268 km from Bangalore.

The waterfall is on the early reaches of the river Kaveri, located between private coffee plantations with stocky coffee bushes and spice estates and trees entwined with pepper vines. There is a hanging bridge constructed just opposite the falls. Flow is much higher during the monsoon season.

The falls was earlier called Jessi Falls, named after a British officer's wife. However, the place was a thick jungle back then. Years later, the waterfall was discovered by Mr. Neravanda B. Nanaiah who bought the place from the government and converted it into a coffee and spice plantation, which still surrounds the waterfall today.

References

External links
 Greens oppose hydel project near Abbi Falls - December 2005

Waterfalls of Karnataka
Tourist attractions in Kodagu district
Geography of Kodagu district